Burlington Township is located in Kane County, Illinois.  As of the 2010 census, its population was 1,921 and it contained 734 housing units. Most of its land use is agricultural.

Geography

The village of Burlington (pop. 535) is located near the center of the township, south of the intersection of Plank Road and Burlington Blacktop/Main Street. It is also known as "Burlington City".

Demographics

References
 
 "Burlington Township". Retrieved 2018-03-17. 

Townships in Kane County, Illinois
Townships in Illinois